Acca is a genus of shrubs and small trees in the family Myrtaceae that is native to Bolivia and Peru. The scientific name of the genus is from a native Peruvian name for A. macrostema.

Acca was first described as a genus in 1856. The genus comprises three species.

 Acca lanuginosa (Ruiz & Pav. ex G.Don) McVaugh - central + southern Peru
 Acca macrostema (Ruiz & Pav. ex G.Don) McVaugh - Bolivia, central + southern Peru
 Acca sellowiana (O.Berg) Burret – southern Brazil, eastern Paraguay, Uruguay, northern Argentina, Colombia

References

External links

Flora of South America
Myrtaceae genera
Myrtaceae